Taste of Conium is the second album by Greek progressive/Blues rock group, Socrates Drank the Conium. The album was released in 1972. It features a thirteen-minute cover of The Rolling Stones song (I Can't Get No) Satisfaction, retitled "Wild Satisfaction". The album was followed by On the Wings.

Track listing

 Wild Satisfaction
 Good Morning Blues
 See See Rider
 Door of the Dream
 Waiting for the Sun
 A Trip in the Sky
 It's OK
 Born to be Free
 She's Gone Away

1972 albums
Socrates Drank the Conium albums